This table displays the top-rated primetime television series of the 1994–95 season as measured by Nielsen Media Research.

References

1994 in American television
1995 in American television
1994-related lists
1995-related lists
Lists of American television series